Arthur Dundore Graeff (September 23, 1899 — March 28, 1969) was an American local historian and author in the Pennsylvania German language. Born in Adamstown, Pennsylvania, he was an alumnus of Franklin and Marshall College in Lancaster. Between 1938 and 1969, Graeff wrote the "Scholla" column three times a week in the Reading Times. Following a long career teaching at Overbrook Senior High School in Philadelphia, he taught at Kutztown University, Alvernia College, and in informal Pennsylvania German weekend and night-school classes. Graeff used the dialect pseudonyms Der Dichter vun de Dolpehock and Der Ewich Yeeger. He was president of the Pennsylvania German Society from 1966 to 1969.

Graeff died in Robesonia, Pennsylvania and is buried in Wernersville at St. John's Hains Cemetery.

Works
Conrad Weiser, Interpeter (1932)
The Relations between the Pennsylvania Germans and the British Authorities, 1750-1776 (Norristown, 1939)
American History Visualized in Pennsylvania German Almanacs (1940)
Old World Backgrounds of American Life (1941)
1942 in Pennsylvania German History (1942)
(with Ralph Charles Wood), The Pennsylvania Germans (Princeton University Press, 1943)
1944 in Pennsylvania German History (1944)
Bicentennial of the Union Church of North Heidelberg, 1744-1944 (1944)
Conrad Weiser, Pennsylvania Peacemaker (1945)
Lebanon County through the Centuries: An Appreciation (1945)
1946 in Pennsylvania German History (1946)
Industrial Berks County 1748-1948: Presented to the People of Reading and Berks County on the Occasion of the Two Hundredth Anniversary of the City of Reading (1948)
The Pennsylvania Germans in Ontario, Canada (1948)
Transplants of Pennsylvania Indian Nations in Ontario (1948)
The Constitution of Pennsylvania (1949)
A History of Steel Casting (1949)
1951 in Pennsylvania German Folklore (1951)
1953 in Pennsylvania German Folklore (1953)
50 Years: Womelsdorf Bank and Trust Company (1953)
The Keystone State: Geography, History, Government (1953)
Collection of Original Documents Selected from the Public Record Office Relating to the Palatine Immigration: Original Documents Selected for Filming from the Colonial Office and Treasury Papers (1954)
The Rittenhouse Line (1956)
A Visitor's Guide to Berks County (1964)
Selections from Arthur Graeff's "Scholla" (1971)
Echoes of "Scholla" Illustrated: Choice Bits of Berks County History and Lore (1976)
Henry Vanderslice, Wagon-master, 1777-1778 (no date)

References
Obituary, Lebanon Daily News, March 29, 1969, p. 2.
Obituary, Allentown The Morning Call, March 29, 1969, p. 15.
Obituary, Lancaster Intelligencer Journal, March 31, 1969, p. 2.
Obituary, Lancaster New Era, March 31, 1969, p. 16.

External links
Grave in Wernersville, Berks County

1899 births
1969 deaths
German-American history
Pennsylvania Dutch people
People from Lancaster County, Pennsylvania
Franklin & Marshall College alumni
Pennsylvania Dutch culture
German language in the United States
Journalists from Pennsylvania